Malaysia Airlines Berhad (MAB), formerly known as Malaysian Airline System (MAS), and branded as Malaysia Airlines, is the flag carrier airline of Malaysia and a member of the Oneworld airline alliance. (The MAS initials are still being kept by subsidiaries MASkargo and MASwings.) The company headquarters are at Kuala Lumpur International Airport. In August 2014, the Malaysian government's sovereign wealth fund Khazanah Nasional—which then owned 69.37% of the airline—announced its intention to purchase the remaining ownership from minority shareholders and delist the airline from Malaysia's stock exchange, thereby renationalising the airline. It operates primarily from Kuala Lumpur International Airport and from secondary hubs in Kota Kinabalu and Kuching to destinations throughout Asia, Oceania, and Europe.

Malaysia Airlines owns two subsidiary airlines: Firefly and MASwings. Firefly operates scheduled flights from its two home bases Penang International Airport and Subang International Airport. The airline focuses on tertiary cities. MASwings focuses on inter-Borneo flights. Malaysia Airlines has a freighter fleet operated by sister company MASkargo, which manages freighter flights and aircraft cargo-hold capacity for all Malaysia Airlines' passenger flights.

Malaysia Airlines traces its history to Malayan Airways Limited, which was founded in Singapore in the 1930s and flew its first commercial flight in 1947. It was then renamed as Malaysian Airways after the formation of the independent country, Malaysia, in 1963. In 1966, after the separation of Singapore, the airline was renamed Malaysia–Singapore Airlines (MSA), before its assets were divided in 1972 to permanently form two separate and distinct national airlines—Malaysian Airline System (MAS, since renamed as Malaysia Airlines) and Singapore Airlines (SIA).

Despite numerous awards from the aviation industry in the 2000s and early 2010s, the airline struggled to cut costs to cope with the rise of low-cost carriers (LCCs) in the region since the early 2000s. In 2013, the airline initiated a turnaround plan after large losses beginning in 2011 and cut routes to unprofitable long-haul destinations, such as Los Angeles, Buenos Aires and South Africa. That same year, Malaysia Airlines also began an internal restructuring and intended to sell units such as engineering and pilot training. From 2014 to 2015, the airline declared bankruptcy and was renationalised by the government under a new entity, which involved transferring all operations, including assets and liabilities as well as downsizing the airline.

History

1937–1941: Wearne's Air Service

Some services were operating between Singapore, Kuala Lumpur, and Penang. Wearne's Air Service was started by two Australian brothers, Theodore and Charles Wearne. The service commenced as a thrice-weekly flight between Singapore and Penang. The first flight, using an eight-seater de Havilland DH.89A Dragon Rapide took place on 28 June 1937. This inaugural flight departed Singapore from the then brand-new Kallang Airport, which had just opened 18 days earlier. Later, a second DH.89A enabled the expansion to daily services  and the addition of Ipoh as a destination. During World War II, WAS services ceased after the Japanese occupation of Malaya and Singapore in 1941.

1947–1963: Malayan Airways

An initiative by the Alfred Holt's Liverpool-based Ocean Steamship Company, in partnership with the Straits Steamship Company and Imperial Airways, resulted in the incorporation of "Malayan Airways Limited" (MAL) in Singapore on 12 October 1937, but the first paying passengers could be welcomed on board only in 1947, some 10 years later. After the war, MAL was restructured to include just the partnership of Straits Steamship and Ocean Steamship. The airline's first flight was a charter flight from the British Straits Settlement of Singapore to Kuala Lumpur, on 2 April 1947, using an Airspeed Consul twin-engined aircraft. This inaugural flight on the Raja Udang, with only five passengers, departed Singapore's Kallang Airport and was bound for Kuala Lumpur's Sungai Besi Airport. Weekly scheduled flights quickly followed from Singapore to Kuala Lumpur, Ipoh, and Penang from 1 May 1947 with the same aircraft type.

The airline continued to expand during the rest of the 1940s and 1950s, as other British Commonwealth airlines, such as BOAC and Qantas Empire Airways, provided technical assistance, as well as assistance in joining the IATA. By 1955, Malayan Airways' fleet had grown to include a large number of Douglas DC-3s, and finally went public in 1957. Other aircraft operated in the first two decades included the Douglas DC-4 Skymaster,  Vickers Viscount,  Lockheed L-1049 Super Constellation,  Bristol Britannia, de Havilland Comet 4, and Fokker F27.

1963–1972: Rapid expansion, Malaysian Airways, and Malaysia-Singapore Airlines

Over the next few years, the airline expanded rapidly, boosted by postwar air travel demand when flying became more than a privilege for the rich and famous. By April 1960, the airline was operating Douglas DC-3s, Super Constellations and Viscounts on new routes from Singapore to Hong Kong, and from Kuala Lumpur to Bangkok via Penang. The airline also increased its frequencies from Singapore to cities on the British Borneo, including Brunei, Jesselton (now Kota Kinabalu), Kuching, Labuan, Sandakan, and Sibu.

With the delivery of an 84-seat Bristol Britannia in 1960, the airline launched its first long-haul international flight, to Hong Kong. When Malaya, Singapore, Sabah, and Sarawak formed Malaysia in September 1963, the airline's name was officially from "Malayan Airways" to "Malaysian Airways" concurrent with the arrival of five Fokker F27 in November 1963 (though still abbreviated to MAL). MAL also incorporated Borneo Airways, with the brand effectively merged under its parent company by 1 April 1965.

In 1966, following Singapore's separation from the federation, the airline's name was changed again, to Malaysia-Singapore Airlines (MSA). The next year had a rapid expansion in the airline's fleet and routes, including the purchase of MSA's first Boeing aircraft: the Boeing 707s, as well as completion of a new high-rise headquarters in Singapore. Boeing 737s were added to the fleet soon afterwards.

1972–1997: Incorporation and international expansion

The differing needs of the two shareholders, however, led to the break-up of the airline just six years later. The Singapore government preferred to develop the airline's international routes, while the Malaysian government had no choice but to develop the domestic network first before going regional and eventually international. MSA ceased operations in 1972, with its assets split between two new airlines; Malaysian Airline System (MAS), and Singapore Airlines. With the Singapore government determined to develop its airlines' international routes, it took the entire fleet of seven Boeing 707s and five Boeing 737s, which would allow it to continue serving its regional and long-haul international routes. Since most of MSA's international routes were flown out of Singapore, most of the international routes were in the hands of Singapore Airlines. In addition, MSA's headquarters, which was located in Singapore, became the headquarters of that airline.

The initials MSA were well regarded as an airline icon, so both carriers tried to use them. Malaysian went for MAS by just transposing the last two letters and choosing the name Malaysian Airline System, while Singapore originally proposed the name Mercury Singapore Airlines to keep the MSA initials, but changed its mind and went for SIA instead. Acronyms for airline names later became less fashionable, and both carriers then moved on to their descriptive names.

MAS took all domestic routes within Malaysia and international routes out of that country, as well as the remaining fleet of Fokker F27's. It began flights on 1 October 1972 with 19 aircraft and soon expanded, including introducing flights from Kuala Lumpur to London. In that year, MAS operated flights to more than 34 regional destinations and six international services. In 1976, after receiving its DC-10-30 aircraft, MAS scheduled flights to Europe, with initial flights from Kuala Lumpur to Amsterdam, Paris, and Frankfurt.

An economic boom in Malaysia during the 1980s spurred the growth of MAS. By the end of the decade, MAS was flying to 47 overseas destinations, including eight European destinations, seven Oceanian destinations, and United States destinations of Los Angeles and Honolulu. In 1993, MAS reached South America when the airline received its Boeing 747 aircraft. MAS became the first airline in Southeast Asia to serve South America via its flights to Buenos Aires, Argentina. Malaysia Airlines also flew to Mexico City between 1994 and 1998 with fifth-freedom rights to carry passengers between Mexico City and Los Angeles, en route to Kuala Lumpur.

1997–2005: Financial struggles
Prior to the Asian Financial Crisis in 1997, the airline suffered losses of as much as RM260 million after earning a record-breaking RM333 million profit in the financial year 1996/1997. The airline then introduced measures to bring it back to profitable. For the financial year 1999/2000, the airline cut its losses from RM700 million in  1998/1999 to RM259 million. 

The airline plunged into further losses in the following years, however, amounting to RM417 million for the financial year 2000/2001 and RM836 million for the financial year 2001/2002.  With these losses, the airline cut many unprofitable routes, such as Brussels, Darwin, Madrid, Munich, and Vancouver. The airline recovered from its losses the following year, achieving its then-highest profit, totalling RM461 million. 

In 2005, MAS suffered yet another period of unprofitability, reporting a loss of RM1.3 billion. Revenue for the financial period was up by 10.3% or RM826.9 million, compared to the same period for 2004, driven by a 10.2% growth in passenger traffic. International passenger revenue increased by RM457.6 million or 8.4%, to RM5.9 billion, while cargo revenue decreased by RM64.1 million or 4.2%, to RM1.5 billion. Costs increased by 28.8% or RM2.3 billion, amounting to a total of RM 10.3 billion, primarily due to escalating fuel prices. Other cost increases included staff costs, handling and landing fees, aircraft maintenance and overhaul charges, widespread assets unbundling charges, and leases.

The Malaysian government then appointed Idris Jala as the new CEO of MAS on 1 December 2005, to execute changes in operations and corporate culture. Several weaknesses in airline operations were identified as the causes of the RM1.3 billion loss. The most substantial factor in the losses was fuel costs. For the period, the total fuel cost was RM3.5 billion, representing a 40.4% increase compared to the same period in 2004. Total fuel cost increases comprised RM977.8 million due to higher fuel prices and another RM157.6 million due to additional consumption. In the third quarter, fuel costs were RM1.26 billion, compared to the RM1.01 billion in the corresponding period in 2004, resulting in a 24.6% increase or RM249.3 million.

Another factor for the losses was poor revenue management. MAS substantially lagged its peers on yield. Some of this gap was due to differences in traffic mix, with less business traffic to and from Malaysia than to and from Singapore, but much of it was due to weaknesses in pricing and revenue management, sales and distribution, brand presence in foreign markets, and alliance base. Moreover, MAS had one of the lowest labour costs per available seat kilometre (ASK) at US$0.41, compared to other airlines such as Cathay Pacific and Singapore Airlines at $0.59 and S$0.60, respectively. Despite low labour costs, however, the ratio of ASK revenue to this cost was, at 2.8, much lower than Singapore Airlines, where the ratio is 5.0, and slightly higher than Thai Airways Other factors were listed in the later-revealed business turnaround plan (BTP) of Malaysia Airlines, all leading to the net loss of RM1.3 billion in 2005.

2006–2010: Recovery from unprofitability

Under the leadership of Idris Jala, MAS launched its BTP in 2006, developed using the Government-linked Company  Transformation Manual as a guide. Under the various initiatives, launched together with the BTP, Malaysia Airlines switched from losses to profitability between 2006 and 2007. When the BTP came to an end, the airline posted a record profit of RM853 million (US$265 million) in 2007, ending a series of losses since 2005. The result exceeded the target of RM300 million by 184%.

Route rationalising was one of the major contributors to the airline's return to profitability. MAS pared its domestic routes from 114 to 23, and also cancelled virtually all unprofitable international routes. It also rescheduled all of its flight timings and changed its operations model from point-to-point services to hub-and-spoke services. Additionally, the airline started Project Omega and Project Alpha to improve the company's network and revenue management. Emphasis has been placed on six areas - pricing, revenue management, network scheduling, opening storefronts, low-season strategy, and distribution management. MAS then pushed for new aircraft purchases, using its cash surplus of RM5.3 billion to eventually purchase new narrow- and wide-body aircraft.

Due to Idris Jala's appointment to the cabinet in August 2009, Tengku Azmil Zahruddin took over as the airline's new CEO. In December that year, MAS announced the purchase of 15 new Airbus A330 aircraft, with options for another 10. Expected to be delivered between 2011 and 2016, they are intended to operate on medium-haul routes to eastern Asia, Australia, and the Middle East. The airline's plans are to run the Airbus A380 planes, which were then introduced into service in 2012, on long-haul routes, the A330s on medium-haul routes, and Boeing 737 aircraft on short-haul routes.

2011–2014: Third unprofitability, 2014 aircraft losses, bankruptcy

MAS recorded a net loss of RM2.52 billion in 2011, which was the largest in its company history, due to rising fuel costs. A major restructuring led to the appointment of a new CEO, Ahmad Jauhari Yahya, in September 2011. One of the first initiatives to stop the losses was a rationalisation of the network. The company suspended services to Surabaya, Karachi, Dubai, Dammam and Johannesburg.

In February 2013, MAS reported a net profit of RM51.4 million for the fourth quarter. The airline's improved financial performance that year was mainly attributable to its route rationalisation programme, which had an overall 8% reduction in ASK. This was matched by a marginal 1% reduction in revenue to RM13.76bil in 2012 and seat factor holding at 74.5%. The reduced ASK also helped MAS register a corresponding 14% decrease in expenditures.

The airline struggled to cut costs to compete with a wave of new, low-cost carriers in the region. The airline lost RM443.4 million (US$137.4 million) in the first quarter of 2014. The second quarter—the first in the aftermath of Flight 370's disappearance – had a loss of RM307.04 million (US$97.6 million), which represented a 75% increase over losses from second-quarter 2013. As a result, MAS has not made a profit since 2010. In the previous three years, the airline had booked losses of RM1.17 billion ($356 million) in 2013, RM433 million in 2012, and RM2.5 billion in 2011. Industry analysts expect MAS to lose further market share and face a challenging environment to stand out from competitors while addressing their financial plight. The company's stock, down as much as 20% following the disappearance of Flight 370, had fallen 80% over the previous five years, which contrasts with a rise in the Malaysian stock market of about 80% over the same period.

A month after the disappearance, CEO Ahmad Jauhari Yahya acknowledged that ticket sales had declined, but did not provide details. This may have partially resulted from the suspension of the airline's advertising campaigns following the disappearance. In China, where the majority of Flight 370 victims were from, bookings on Malaysia Airlines were down 60% in March. He said he was not sure when the airline could start repairing its image, but that the airline was adequately insured to cover the financial loss stemming from the incident. In August, the airline warned of poor second-half earnings, citing a 33% decline in average weekly bookings following the loss of Flight 17. Media reported that some flights were largely empty and that the airline had slashed prices well below competitors on several key routes.
Even before the shootdown of Flight 17, many analysts and the media suggested that Malaysia Airlines would need to rebrand and repair its image and/or require government assistance to return to profitability. On 8 August, trading in the company's stock was temporarily suspended when Khazanah Nasional—the majority shareholder (69.37%) and a Malaysian state-run investment arm—requested that MAS' Board of Directors undertake a selective capital reduction exercise (e.g. buyback or cancel stock of other shareholders); Khazanah announced it will spend  (US$431 million; 27 sen per share) to compensate minority shareholders (a 12.5% premium of 7 August closing price). At the time, Khazanah Nasional did not announce much about its plans for the airline except that the airline had "substantial funding requirements" and that a "comprehensive review and restructuring" was needed.

On 29 August, Khazanah released a report, "Rebuilding a National Icon: The MAS Recovery Plan", which outlines their plan for the restructuring of MAS and the process of completing the takeover. About 6,000 jobs (about 30% of MAS's workforce) will be eliminated and the carrier's route network will be shrunk to focus on regional destinations rather than unprofitable long-haul routes. Khazanah had plans to delist the airline from Malaysia's stock exchange by the end of 2014 and to return it to profitability by late 2017, relisting the airline by 2018 or 2019. On the business/legal side, Khazanah intended to transfer the relevant operations, assets, and liabilities of Malaysian Airline System Berhad into a new company (no name given in documents) by July 2015.

2015–present: Renationalisation, restructuring, and rebranding 

In January 2015, the airline was declared "technically bankrupt". In May 2015, it was announced that the airline will be transferred to a newly founded Malaysia Airlines Berhad (MAB) by 1 September 2015, with the rebranding of the airline also commencing the same day. The new company will have a heavily reduced workforce and adjusted route network with a focus on Asia according to its newly appointed CEO, Christoph Mueller. He also announced that Malaysia Airlines put some of its Airbus A380s up for sale.

Four months later, MAB announced that they would add four new Airbus A350-900 aircraft to their fleet from the end of 2017 to the middle of 2018. The aircraft were to be leased from Air Lease Corporation. The airline also expected to add two more A350-900 and two Airbus A330-900 aircraft in the future. MAB then announced that it is set to undergo a brand overhaul involving a new name, logo and livery for its aircraft, with the changes to be unveiled on an unspecified date.

In January 2016, the airline introduced a policy of not serving alcohol on flights of less than three hours. While the move was unpopular with many travellers, the airline stated that its actions were in response to the preference of the majority of customers.

In April 2016, CEO Christoph Mueller resigned from his post after less than a year of leading the carrier's reorganisation efforts, citing changing personal circumstances. Mueller initially planned to continue as CEO until September 2016 and stay on the airline's board as a nonexecutive director to oversee the transition to a new CEO. It was announced that Peter Bellew would become the new chief with effect from 1 July 2016, effectively shortening Mueller's tenure by a further two months.

In April 2017, Malaysia Airlines announced that the airline's entire fleet will be tracked with the satellite flight-tracking system.

In October 2017, an unexpected announcement was made that Malaysia Airlines CEO Peter Bellew will return to Ryanair as chief operations officer to help fix pilot problems. Bellew had worked as a flight operations director at Ryanair until 2014. Bellew's decision to leave Malaysia Airlines came just over a year after former chief executive Christoph Mueller left the airline citing personal circumstances a year after being hired on a three-year mission to revive the state-controlled firm. The appointment of Mueller's replacement, Captain Izham Ismail, who served as the airline's chief operating officer prior to the appointment, was announced a few days later.

On 6 April 2020, the Malaysian private equity firm Golden Skies Ventures reportedly had made an offer of US$2.5 billion to take over Malaysia Airlines during the COVID-19 pandemic.

In October 2020, with the COVID-19 pandemic, Malaysia Airlines needs about RM1 billion of capital annually if the government intends to sustain its operations under the current structure.

Corporate affairs

Head office
Malaysia Airlines has its headquarters and registered office on the first floor of Administration Building, South Support Zone at Kuala Lumpur International Airport (KLIA), Sepang, in the Klang Valley region.

Previously the airline headquarters were on the third floor of the MAS Administrative Complex at Subang Airport, in Subang. Prior to the construction of the Kuala Lumpur MAS headquarters, the airline rented space in the UMBC headquarters. The airline had a permanent corporate headquarters in the Bangunan MAS, a 34-story building it owned along Jalan Sultan Ismail. In 2005 The Star said that the building was "reported to be worth between RM300mil and RM350mil."

In 2006, the airline moved its head office from the Kuala Lumpur building to the former headquarters in Subang. Channel News Asia stated that the airline had been "forced" to sell the former headquarters.

In 2010, Permodalan Nasional Berhad purchased Bangunan MAS from the airline. The new owners planned to remodel the building, by installing a five-star hotel apartment block and upgrade the offices to Grade A++.

Subsidiaries
The airline has diversified into related industries and sectors, including aircraft ground handling, aircraft leasing, aviation engineering, air catering, and tour operator operations. It has also restructured itself by spinning-off operational units as fully owned subsidiaries to maintain its core business as a passenger airline. In 2013, Malaysia Airlines has 28 subsidiaries, with 25 of them fully owned by Malaysia Airlines.

Some of the subsidiaries include:

Financial highlights
Malaysia Airlines experienced a RM1.25 billion loss in 2005. In 2006, the Business Turnaround Plan was introduced to revive the airline. At the end of the airline's turnaround program, in financial year 2007, Malaysia Airlines gained RM851 million net profit: a swing of RM987 million compared to RM134 million in losses in 2006, marking the national carrier's highest-ever profit in its sixty-year history. The achievement was recognised as the world's best airline-turnaround story in 2007, with Malaysia Airlines being awarded the Phoenix award by Penton Media's Air Transport World.

Branding
From the late 1990s until 2007, Malaysia Airlines used the slogan "Going Beyond Expectations" to brand itself internationally. In 2008, the new branding strategy slogan became "More than just an airline code. MH is Malaysian Hospitality", to emphasise the hospitality of its cabin crew instead of the airline's network and cabin classes.

Since 2013, the airline has been using the slogan "Journeys are made by people you travel with". However, with the onset of Flight 370 and Flight 17, the airline has used a number of slogans including "#keepflying" and "#flyinghigh". A new slogan, "Malaysian Hospitality Begins With Us", was unveiled in 2018.

Corporate image
Malaysia Airlines introduced the Sarong Kebaya design on 1 March 1986 for female flight attendants. It was designed by the School of Fashion at Mara Institute of Technology and later known as Mara University of Technology. The batik material depicts the "kelarai" motif, which is a bamboo weave pattern. It appears in the background in subdued hues of the basic uniform colour. Superimposed on the "kelarai" motif is a mixture of Malaysian flora, such as the cempaka, jasmine and the leaves of the hibiscus. The geometric Sarawakian motif is used for the lapels of the baju, edges of sleeves and the "sarong". In January 1993, the colours of the batik were enhanced to complement the colour of the new uniform. The male flight attendants wear grey colour jackets.

Corporate logo

The history of the airline started in 1937, when Malayan Airways Limited was registered as a company. Flying operations started in 1947, with the aircraft bearing the symbol of a winged tiger. A new logo was introduced with the formation of Malaysia-Singapore Airlines in 1966 , featuring the initials of the airline's name, MSA.

In 1971, MSA split into two airlines, each with its own policies and objectives, leading to the birth of Malaysia's flag carrier, Malaysian Airline System (MAS). The name was chosen because, in abbreviated form, MAS (as in EMAS) in Malay means gold, to symbolise quality service. A corporate logo based on the wau bulan (moon kite) was eventually adopted in the following years.

A new corporate logo designed by Dato' Johan Ariff of Johan Design Associates was introduced on 15 October 1987, retaining the essence of the moon kite, now with a sheared swept-back look painted in red (top) and blue (bottom). Along with the new corporate logo, a new type style – MALAYSIA, was created. It is italicised to slant parallel with the logo to accentuate speed as well as direction. Within this corporate typestyle, the letters M, A and S bear red clippings to denote the initials of the statutory name of the airline, Malaysian Airline System (MAS). They were added after the original design was rejected by former Prime Minister Mahathir Mohamad.  The introduction of blue to the original red logo has national significance. 

Beginning 2010, all of Malaysia Airlines' new Airbus A330 and Boeing 737 aircraft sport the new standard airline livery featuring two strips of red and blue emerging from the bottom of the fuselage. The wau bulan on the tail was also refreshed. Although still featuring a sheared swept-back look with its colours in red and blue, its tails have been extended to appear twinned. Moreover, the airline's name on the fuselage is presented in full unlike before and it is entirely blue.

In 2012, the corporate logo of red and blue wau bulan was refreshed. The new wau bulan faces right, as it did in the original 1971 logo, and its tails have been extended. Initially, the airline settled for an all blue wau bulan but it has since reverted it to its red and blue form. The wordmark has also been modernised with a new typeface and the word "airlines" is now presented in lowercase. That same year, the airline also unveiled a new and exclusive livery for its Airbus A380 fleet to highlight the flagship carrier of the airline. It features an all-blue wau bulan on the tail and strip of blue ribbon on the fuselage and engines, the airline's name is entirely in blue as well.

Alliance

In August 2011, Malaysia Airlines agreed to collaborate with AirAsia through a share swap. The share swap between Malaysia Airlines' major shareholder and that of AirAsia was later undone in May 2012 due to resistance from certain quarters of its staff.

On 1 February 2013, Malaysia Airlines became a member of the Oneworld alliance, thus adding 16 new destinations into the alliance's map. Malaysia Airlines would now be able to fly its passengers to over 842 destinations across 156 countries.

As in December 2020, Malaysia airlines now flies to a total of 59 destinations which consist of Domestic Malaysia, South East Asia, China, North Asia, South Asia, Australia, New Zealand and United Kingdom.

Destinations

Before the introduction of the Business Turnaround Plan in 2006, Malaysia Airlines operated 118 domestic routes within Malaysia and 114 international routes across six continents. Under the Business Turnaround Plan, numerous routes were axed and frequencies reduced. Among these routes are Manchester, Vienna, Fukuoka, Chengdu, Nagoya, Xi'an, Cairo, Kolkata, Ahmedabad and Zürich. Malaysia Airlines became the first airline in Southeast Asia to fly to South Africa, following the demise of apartheid, and was the only airline in Southeast Asia that served South America via South Africa until 2012. Prior the MH17 and MH370's crashes, it had further suspended services to Cape Town, Rome, Dammam, Karachi, Surabaya, Johannesburg and Los Angeles. After the removal of the destinations such as Istanbul, Malé, Amsterdam, Paris, Brisbane (resumed June 2018), Frankfurt, Kunming, Krabi and Kochi (resumed March 2019), London (Heathrow) is the only remaining European destination.

As of March 2017, Malaysia Airlines flies to 57 destinations across Southeast Asia, North and South Asia, the Middle East, Australia and Europe. Its primary hub is Kuala Lumpur International Airport. It has a particularly strong presence in the Southeast Asia region, which, together with its subsidiaries MASWings and Firefly, connects Kuala Lumpur to the most destinations in Borneo. Apart from that, the airline has a key role in the Kangaroo Route, on which the airline provides onward connecting flights from main European gateways to major Australian and New Zealand gateways via Kuala Lumpur, within five hours.
 
Malaysia Airlines also owns its own charter flight division. Malaysia Airlines' charter flights have flown to destinations around the world, such as Guilin, which was previously one of Malaysia Airlines' scheduled destinations, and Christmas Island. Malaysia Airlines has also been the official airline for the Manchester United Asian Tour It also has a substantial Hajj operation.

Codeshare agreements
Malaysia Airlines codeshares with the following airlines:

 Air Mauritius
 American Airlines
 Bangkok Airways
 British Airways
 Cathay Pacific
 China Airlines
 Emirates
 Ethiopian Airlines
 Finnair
 Firefly (subsidiary)
 Garuda Indonesia
 Japan Airlines
 KLM
 Korean Air
 LATAM Chile
 MASWings (subsidiary)
 Myanmar Airways International
 Oman Air
 Philippine Airlines
 Qatar Airways
 Qantas
 Royal Brunei Airlines
 Royal Jordanian
 Saudia
 Singapore Airlines
 SriLankan Airlines
 Thai Airways International
 Turkish Airlines
 Uzbekistan Airways
 XiamenAir

Interline agreements 
Malaysia Airlines has an Interline agreement with Pakistan International Airlines.

Fleet

As of November 2020, Malaysia Airlines has a total of 81 active aircraft in its fleet, consisting of an all-Boeing fleet of narrow-body jets (48 planes) and an all-Airbus fleet of wide-body jets (33).

In August 2022, Malaysia Airlines confirmed it would take delivery of an initial order of 20 Airbus A330neo aircraft, with purchase options for an additional 20, to gradually replace its A330-200 and A330-300 aircraft between Q3 2023 and 2028 for flights across Asia, the Pacific and the Middle East. The deliveries are set to be split between 10 direct purchases and 10 leases from Ireland's Avolon.

Services
The Golden Lounge is the airport lounge for Malaysia Airlines Business Suite Class, Business Class passengers and Enrich Platinum and Enrich Gold, eligible Oneworld and code-share partner members. The Golden Lounges have open bars and food catering. There are Golden Lounges throughout the world, and qualified passengers have reciprocal privileges at lounges operated by selected partners. The lounge offers services such as business centres, food catering, slumber rooms and child-care centres.

Lounges are maintained at the following airports:
 Kuala Lumpur–International
 Kota Kinabalu
 Kuching
 London–Heathrow

In April 2008, the airline launched its new Regional Golden Lounge at Kuala Lumpur International Airport for regional-bound front-end passengers. With this new lounge, Malaysia Airlines at Kuala Lumpur International Airport now has three lounges: the Satellite International Terminal Lounge, Domestic Lounge and Regional Lounge. Between May 2017 and February 2018, Malaysia Airlines conducted an extensive renovation that saw all three lounges at Kuala Lumpur International Airport progressively refurnished and remodelled. The renovation saw completion with the re-opening of the Satellite International Lounge in March 2018.

Cabin

The airline received the "World's Best Cabin Crew" award by Skytrax in 2012, bringing home the international accolade eight times since 2001.
All of Malaysia Airlines' aircraft have an economy and a business class section, whilst Business Suite class is only present on Airbus A350 aircraft.

Business Suite Class

Business Suite Class (previously known as First Class) is offered only on the Airbus A350. On the Airbus A350, the airline offers four fully enclosed suites with doors, and storage cabinets along the sides of the seats.

Business Class
Business Class (previously known as Golden Club Class) is available on all of Malaysia Airlines' fleet. In 2011, Malaysia Airlines introduced the new Business Class seats on their brand new Airbus A330-300. Newer regional business class seats were also introduced on the Boeing 737-800 to be used on short-medium haul routes such as Kota Kinabalu, Taipei and Manila.

In April 2016, Malaysia Airlines introduced a new Business Class seat provided by Thompson Aero Seating equipped with fully lie-flat seats with configured in (1-2-1/1-2-2), for their A330-300. The same seat is subsequently used on the Airbus A350 fleet.

In March 2018, following the delivery of the Airbus A330-200 fleet, Malaysia Airlines introduced another Business Class seat configuration retained from the previous operator of the aircraft, Air Berlin. Business Class are configured in a 1-2-1 lay-out with seats from manufacturer, Stelia. These planes are usually flown to high demand regional destinations and Auckland.

Economy Class
Economy Class is available on all of Malaysia Airlines' fleet. Most of the fleet, including the Airbus A350-900, Airbus A330-300,-200 and Boeing 737-800 features a seat pitch of 30–32 inches and width of 17–18 inches. Some of the Boeing 737-800, of which are leased, have no personal TV but overhead TV's located in the aisles of the plane and feature a seat pitch of 29–30 inches.  All A380s, A350-900s, A330-300s and newer Boeing 737-800 have the Select 3000i personal in-flight entertainment systems.

In 2010, the Malaysia Airlines' Economy Class was awarded the "World's Best Economy Class" award by Skytrax.

'Baby ban' and 'child-free zone'
Malaysia Airlines has attracted both criticism and praise for its controversial decision to prohibit children from travelling in certain classes or cabins of its aircraft.

Infants are not permitted in First Class on Malaysia Airlines' Airbus A380s due to the non-availability of baby bassinets in the cabin. Then-CEO Tengku Azmil Zahruddin explained the policy, saying the airline received complaints from First Class passengers that they "spend money on first class and can't sleep due to crying infants".

Malaysia Airlines subsequently claimed that an upgrade of the First Class cabin to fit new seats and an ottoman (which doubles as a visitor seat) meant "there was no facility for positioning bassinets in the First Class of the 747s".
Malaysia Airlines has also stated that children under the age of 12 may not travel in the 70-seat upper deck economy section of the A380. "The economy seats on upper level will be allocated for business travellers. Passengers accompanying children under 12 years old age will be excluded from booking these seats."

Malaysia Airlines says the decision "is to showcase the Economy Class zone in the main deck, enhanced and designated as a family and children friendly inflight zone. From the perspective of customers travelling with their families, the economy class family-friendly convenience would be a warm welcome. The main deck has more facilities such as toilets (8 for economy configuration of 350 seats) and the dual aerobridge airport facility supporting this deck will also mean a speedier/faster embarkation and disembarkation for this group of passengers."

In-flight entertainment
Select is the in-flight entertainment system of Malaysia Airlines. There are three types of Select: Select 3000i,
Select 3000i Portable Media Player, and Select Mainscreen.

Select 3000i

All Malaysia Airlines Airbus A350-900, Airbus A330-300,-200 and newer Boeing 737-800 aircraft are equipped with an Inflight entertainment system, Select 3000i, with audio and video available in 14 languages. A touch-screen personal TV is available on board these aircraft.
New deliveries of the Boeing 737-800 (9M-MX* and -MS*) aircraft would carry touch-screen based Select 3000i.

Select 3000i Portable Media Player
 The Select 3000i Portable Media Player is provided to Malaysia Airlines' Business Class passengers on selected regional and medium-haul routes when operated by Boeing 737-800 (ML*) aircraft. It allows passengers a choice of movies, TV shows, sports and video games.

Select Mainscreen
Used in Economy Class on Boeing 737-800 (9M-ML*) regional and medium-haul aircraft, which features 15-inch drop-down retractable LCD screens are installed at every fourth seat row.

Sponsorships
Malaysia Airlines signed a 3-year sponsorship deal with Premier League club Liverpool FC in October 2016, which gives them the right to be its Official Global Airline Partner. In addition, a six-minute advertisement video of Malaysia Airlines will be broadcast during home games at Anfield until the 2018-2019 season.

Frequent-flyer programs
Malaysia Airlines' frequent flyer program is called Enrich by Malaysia Airlines. Enrich comprises airlines, banks, credit-card issuers, hotels and retailers around the world.

Esteemed Traveller

On 30 September 1987, the airline introduced the Esteemed Traveller frequent-flyer program. In the early 1990s, Malaysia Airlines, Cathay Pacific, Thai Airways International and Singapore Airlines launched their joint Asian frequent-flyer program: Passages. The joint program was officially dissolved in 1999, and the Enrich frequent-flyer program made its debut after the split from Passages.

Enrich by Malaysia Airlines
On 12 July 2006, Malaysia Airlines introduced its enhanced frequent-flyer program. The program is now known as Enrich by Malaysia Airlines (Enrich).

Members of Enrich are able to accrue miles on qualifying flights through Malaysia Airlines and Enrich airline partners:
 Oneworld alliance airline partners (effective 1 February 2013)
 Air France, Alitalia, Etihad Airways, Emirates Airline, KLM, Virgin Atlantic, Firefly, MASwings

Incidents and accidents
 4 December 1977 – Malaysian Airline System Flight 653, a Boeing 737-200 – registered 9M-MBD – was hijacked and crashed in Tanjung Kupang, Johor, killing all 100 people on board.
 18 December 1983 – Malaysian Airline System Flight 684, an Airbus A300B2 – registered OY-KAA – crashed 2 km short of the runway at Subang Airport, with no fatalities among the 247 passengers and crew.
 15 September 1995 – Malaysia Airlines Flight 2133, a Fokker 50 – registered 9M-MGH – touched down too far along the runway at Tawau Airport, Sabah and crashed in a shantytown during the subsequent go-around. Of the 49 passengers and 4 crew on board, 32 passengers and 2 crew were killed. The probable cause was poor handling of the aircraft by the pilot.
 8 March 2014 – Malaysia Airlines Flight 370, a Boeing 777-200ER – registered 9M-MRO – carrying 227 passengers and 12 crew, went missing on a flight from Kuala Lumpur International Airport to Beijing Capital International Airport. Although the whereabouts of the plane remain unknown, satellite data indicates that the plane was lost in the Southern Indian Ocean and all 239 people on board perished. On 5 August 2015 the Malaysian government confirmed a flaperon from a 777 found washed up on Réunion Island belonged to Flight 370. A piece of aircraft wreckage (an outboard flap) found on Pemba Island off the Tanzanian coast in June 2016 was also confirmed by the Malaysian Transport Ministry to belong to MH370.
 17 July 2014 – Malaysia Airlines Flight 17, a Boeing 777-200ER – registered 9M-MRD – en route to Kuala Lumpur International Airport from Amsterdam Schiphol Airport was shot down over Ukraine by a Buk surface-to-air missile. All 283 passengers and 15 crew members aboard were killed.

See also

 List of companies of Malaysia
 List of airports in Malaysia
 Transport in Malaysia

References

External links

 
 Route Map
 
 Penerbangan Malaysia Berhad – Parent Company (archive)
 Malaysian Airline System Berhad
 Malaysian Airline System Bhd, bloomberg.com
 Malaysian Airline System Berhad (MYX: 3786), bursamalaysia.com

Malayan Airways
Airlines of Malaysia
Association of Asia Pacific Airlines
Government-owned airlines
Government-owned companies of Malaysia
Kuala Lumpur International Airport
Malaysian brands
1947 establishments in Malaya
Companies formerly listed on Bursa Malaysia
Privately held companies of Malaysia
Khazanah Nasional
Companies based in Sepang